Hipgrave is a surname. Notable people with the surname include:

Dan Hipgrave (born 1975), English musician and writer
Keegan Hipgrave (born 1997), Australian rugby league footballer
Lynsey Hipgrave (born 1979), English television and radio presenter and journalist